The Operating Passenger Railroad Stations Thematic Resource is a list of 53 New Jersey Transit stations in New Jersey entered into the New Jersey Register of Historic Places and National Register of Historic Places in 1984 for their architectural, historical, and cultural merit.

Background

Rail service in New Jersey began in 1834. Over the course of the next century, an expansive system operated by competing private companies crisscrossed the state, providing freight, long-distance and commuter passenger service. By the mid 1970s most were financially troubled. Amtrak began operations on May 1, 1971 after having taken over long-distance passenger service considered to be in the nation's best interest, including the Northeast Corridor in New Jersey. Statewide commuter services came under the auspices of the New Jersey Department of Transportation and were operated under contract by Conrail, which had been established in 1976. New Jersey Transit Rail Operations (NJTRO) was established by 1983 when New Jersey Transit (NJT) took over operations.

Thematic Nomination
New Jersey Transit in conjunction with State Historic Preservation Office (SHPO) commissioned a field study concluded in 1981 of 112 train station buildings, or head houses, under its jurisdiction that had been built before World War II and were still in operation, which culminated in a report The Operating Railroad Stations of New Jersey: A Historical Survey. After a process of elimination over the next years the SHPO recommended that fifty-three stations be included in a multiple property submission (MPS) thematic nomination (TN); several had been previously designated, some as contributing properties to historic districts.  The NJRHP designation took place on March 17, 1984 (#5080). The MPS was made on May 8, 1984. Forty of the stations were entered into the NRHP on June 22, 1984 and the remainder were entered as part of the completed TN on September 29, 1984 (#64000496). Many stations were along former lines that had become part of NJTRO, one of which is used by Southeastern Pennsylvania Transportation Authority (SEPTA).

The oldest  station building, the Long-a-Coming Depot, built in 1856, and the oldest active station building, Ramsey-Main Street Station, built in 1868, were not listed. Also not included in the TN were two significant individually-listed historic operating stations, Newark Pennsylvania Station and Hoboken Terminal, both of which are major rail hubs that also serve as terminals for light rail, PATH subway trains, and in the case of Hoboken, ferries across the Hudson River. Another former intermodal station, the inactive Communipaw Terminal on the Upper New York Bay, had also been previously listed. There are other stations which have also been listed on the state and federal register, such as Mountain Lakes and Demarest which were not part of the TN since they were inactive at the time, were not considered sufficiently significant, or were not part of the NJT system.

List

Other historic designations
Among the others stations in the state, most of which of are inactive, listed in the state and federal registers are Allenhurst (NJT) (station building demolished), Butler (NYSW), Cary (CNJ), Demarest (Erie Northern Branch), Great Meadows (L&HR), Long-a-Coming Depot, Maywood (NYSW), Mountain Lakes, North Pemberton (C&A), Pennington (Reading), Pompton Plains (Erie), Rio Grande (WJ), Tenafly (Erie Northern Branch), and Washington (DL&W) (demolished).

Abbreviations
C&A=Camden and Amboy
CNJ=Central Railroad of New Jersey
CP=contributing property
DL&W=Delaware, Lackawanna and Western Railroad
Erie=Erie Railroad
H&M=Hudson and Manhattan Railroad
L&HR=Lehigh and Hudson River Railway
M&E=Morris and Essex Railroad
N&E=New York and Erie Railroad
NEC=Northeast Corridor
NYGL=New York and Greenwood Lake Railway
NRHP=National Register of Historic Places
NJDOT=New Jersey Department of Transportation
NJRHP=New Jersey Register of Historic Places
NJT=New Jersey Transit
NYS&W=New York, Susquehanna and Western Railway
NS=Norfolk Southern Railway
PATH=Port Authority Trans-Hudson
PRR=Pennsylvania Railroad
PS=Public Service Railway
SEPTA=Southeastern Pennsylvania Transportation Authority
SHPO=State Historic Preservation Office
TN=thematic nomination
TR=thematic resource
WJ=West Jersey and Seashore Railroad

See also
Bradford Gilbert, who designed many notable registered stations
Frank J. Nies, DL&W architect who designed many notable registered stations
List of New Jersey Transit stations
List of the oldest buildings in New Jersey
List of companies transferred to Conrail
National Register of Historic Places listings in New Jersey
Garfield Tea House
Erie Railroad Signal Tower, Waldwick Yard
Philadelphia and Reading Railroad Freight Station
Morristown and Erie Railroad Whippany Water Tank
Raritan River Freight Station

References

Railway stations on the National Register of Historic Places in New Jersey
New Jersey Register of Historic Places
Lists of New Jersey railway stations
NJ Transit train stations
National Register of Historic Places Multiple Property Submissions in New Jersey